The 2016 World RX of Portugal was the first round of the third season of the FIA World Rallycross Championship. The event was held at the Pista Automovel de Montalegre in Montalegre.

Heats

Semi-finals

Semi-final 1

Semi-final 2

Final

Championship standings after the event

References

External links

|- style="text-align:center"
|width="35%"|Previous race:2015 World RX of Argentina
|width="30%"|FIA World Rallycross Championship2016 season
|width="35%"|Next race:2016 World RX of Hockenheim
|- style="text-align:center"
|width="35%"|Previous race:2015 World RX of Portugal
|width="30%"|World RX of Portugal
|width="35%"|Next race:2017 World RX of Portugal
|- style="text-align:center"

Portugal
World RX
World RX